Philip Theodor Ringe was a Livonian silversmith and jeweler and a Fabergé workmaster. He was born in Riga in Livonia in 1824. He was head of a small workshop at 12 Malaya Morskaya producing modest enameled articles (seals, parasol handles, thermometers, beltbuckles, miniature easter eggs, sweet boxes) in gold and silver. He was an outworker for Fabergé with the mark 'T.R'. After his death, in 1894, his widow Anna Karlovna Ringe (1840-1912) was the head of the workshop but soon Anders Mickelson and Vassily Soloviev ran it first as assistants, and independently from 1912.

References

 H.C. Bainbridge, Peter Carl Fabergé: Goldsmith and Jeweller to the Russian Imperial Court (1966)
 G.von Habsburg-Lothringen & A.von Solodkoff, Fabergé - Court Jeweler to the Tsars (1979) 
 Ulla Tillander-Godenhielm, Fabergén suomalaiset mestarit (Fabergé´s Finnish masters) (2011), p. 257 

Silversmiths from the Russian Empire
Fabergé workmasters
Businesspeople from the Russian Empire
1824 births
1882 deaths